Jim Fox (born October 2, 1973) is an American college men's basketball coach who is the former head coach for Appalachian State University. He was also a longtime assistant coach at Davidson College.

Head coaching record

References

1973 births
Living people
American men's basketball coaches
Appalachian State Mountaineers men's basketball coaches
College men's basketball head coaches in the United States
Davidson Wildcats men's basketball coaches
High school basketball coaches in the United States
People from Levittown, New York
Sportspeople from Nassau County, New York
State University of New York at Geneseo alumni